Pelaneng Airport  is an airport serving the settlement of Pelaneng, Lesotho.

The high elevation, unmarked airstrip sits on a narrow ridge south of the confluence of the Pelaneng and Malibamatso rivers, with rising terrain to the west and a 400+ ft drop into the river valley off the east end. Landing east is less obstructed, but the downhill slope, short runway, and dropoff make it inadvisable.

Latest aerial imaging shows an embanked roadway has been cut across the runway, rendering the runway unusable.

See also
Transport in Lesotho
List of airports in Lesotho

References

External links
 Pelaneng Airport
 Google Earth

Airports in Lesotho